Souths may refer to:
 South Sydney Rabbitohs, a National Rugby League team
 Souths Rugby, a Queensland Premier Rugby team
 Souths Logan Magpies, a rugby league team based in the southern suburbs of Brisbane, Australia

See also
South (disambiguation)